The canton of Orthe et Arrigans is an administrative division of the Landes department, southwestern France. It was created at the French canton reorganisation which came into effect in March 2015. Its seat is in Peyrehorade.

It consists of the following communes:
 
Bélus
Cagnotte
Cauneille
Estibeaux
Gaas
Habas
Hastingues
Labatut
Mimbaste
Misson
Mouscardès
Oeyregave
Orist
Orthevielle
Ossages
Pey
Peyrehorade
Port-de-Lanne
Pouillon
Saint-Cricq-du-Gave
Saint-Étienne-d'Orthe
Saint-Lon-les-Mines
Sorde-l'Abbaye
Tilh

References

Cantons of Landes (department)